The 1947 Segunda División Peruana, the second division of Peruvian football (soccer), was played by 8 teams. The tournament winner, Jorge Chávez (C)  was promoted to the Primera División Peruana 1948.

Results

Standings

External links
 La Historia de la Segunda 1947

 

Peruvian Segunda División seasons
Peru2
2